S. Dale High is Chair Emeritus of Lancaster, Pennsylvania-based High Industries Inc. and High Real Estate Group LLC. He is a past board member of the U.S. Chamber of Commerce.

High is a graduate of Elizabethtown College.

The S. Dale High Center for Family Business 
In 1995, S. Dale High founded the S. Dale High Center for Family Business at Elizabethtown College.

External links 

 The S. Dale High Center for Family Business

References 

Elizabethtown College alumni
Living people
United States Chamber of Commerce people
Year of birth missing (living people)